Edward Benjamin 'Ed' Townsend (April 16, 1929 – August 13, 2003) was an American singer, songwriter, producer and attorney. He performed and composed "For Your Love", a rhythm and blues doo wop classic, and co-wrote "Let's Get It On" with Marvin Gaye.

Biography
Townsend was born in Fayetteville, Tennessee, United States, and his family soon moved to Memphis where his father was pastor at an African Methodist Episcopal church.

The year Townsend graduated from high school, he was elected to the International American Methodist Episcopal Youth Council (IAMEYC) and traveled worldwide before enrolling in college the next year at the University of Arkansas at Pine Bluff (formerly Arkansas AM&N College).  After graduating, he taught for a year. Although he never formally practiced law, he frequently used his law training to assist other entertainers in negotiating their recording and performance contracts.

In 1951, Townsend joined the United States Marine Corps and served in Korea. After his discharge, he recorded a number of singles for various labels, none of which made the charts. In 1958, he took his ballad, "For Your Love" to Capitol Records, hoping to interest Nat "King" Cole, but, impressed with his voice, Capitol signed him to record it himself. Dick Clark had just started American Bandstand on television and invited Townsend to sing the first month the show aired. He was an overnight success and the song peaked at number 13 in the Billboard Hot 100. Later in 1958 he reached No. 59 with a rendition of "When I Grow Too Old to Dream".

Townsend had no further vocal hits of his own. In 1962, he wrote a song for soul singer, Jimmy Holiday, "How Can I Forget?", which was later covered by Ben E. King. Then he wrote and produced Theola Kilgore’s "The Love of My Man." He also composed "Tears Of Joy", "Hand It Over", "I Might Like It", "Since I Found You" and "Foolish Fool". In the early 1970s, Ed Townsend teamed up with Marvin Gaye to co-write the song "Let's Get It On", and co-produce the album of the same title.

Townsend performed on the PBS television special "Rock, Rhythm, and Doo Wop" filmed at the Benedum Center in Pittsburgh, Pennsylvania on May 16 and 17, 2000. DVDs of the event were sold as fundraisers for PBS stations nationwide.

Ed's son David Townsend, of the band Surface, died at age fifty in 2005.

Honored with a Purple Heart in the Korean War, Townsend is buried at Riverside National Cemetery in Riverside, California.

Discography

Albums

Singles

Filmography
Townsend served as composer for:
The Ultimate Thrill (1974)

References
 ASCAP Biographical Dictionary. R. R. Bowker Co., 1980.

Notes

External links
 
 

1929 births
2003 deaths
Carlton Records artists
Challenge Records artists
Liberty Records artists
Capitol Records artists
Warner Records artists
People from Fayetteville, Tennessee
Arkansas State University alumni
Burials at Riverside National Cemetery
People from Mound Bayou, Mississippi